Hargy is a large volcanic caldera on the island of New Britain, Papua New Guinea. It also hosts an inner-caldera with a steep west-facing wall. Lake Hargy, located within the caldera, drains through a narrow river that runs along the northern wall. The caldera-forming eruption occurred approximately 11,000 years ago (5050 BCE). At the western part of the caldera rises Galloseulo, a post-caldera dacitic lava cone with a -wide crater, occupied by a pair of smaller craters. Galloseulo has produced many small eruptions in the past 7,000 years, with the most recent in 950 CE. In September 1990, minor fumarolic activity was observed in the western summit crater of Galloseulo.

References

Volcanoes of New Britain
Stratovolcanoes of Papua New Guinea
Calderas of Papua New Guinea
VEI-6 volcanoes
West New Britain Province
Prehistoric volcanic events
Lakes of Papua New Guinea